Copper Hill may refer to:

 Copper Hill, Arizona
 Copper Hill, New Jersey
 Copper Hill, Virginia